Eha Rünne (born 25 May 1963 in Tallinn) is a female shot putter and discus thrower from Estonia, who competed in the discus contest at the 1996 Summer Olympics in Atlanta, Georgia. There she ended up in 26th place (58.24 metres).

Rünne set her personal best in the women's discus throw event (63.18 metres) on 13 July 1988 in Pärnu. She also competed for her native country at the 2004 Summer Olympics, finishing in 37th place in the discus event.

Achievements

References

External links

1963 births
Living people
Athletes from Tallinn
Estonian female discus throwers
Estonian female shot putters
Olympic athletes of Estonia
Athletes (track and field) at the 1996 Summer Olympics
Athletes (track and field) at the 2004 Summer Olympics
World Athletics Championships athletes for Estonia